The 2016–17 Boise State Broncos women's basketball team represents Boise State University during the 2016–17 NCAA Division I women's basketball season. The Broncos, led by 12th-year head coach Gordy Presnell, play their home games at Taco Bell Arena as a member of the Mountain West Conference. They finished the season 22–11, 11–7 in Mountain West play to a finish in a tie for third place. They were also champions of the Mountain West women's tournament and earn an automatic trip to the NCAA women's tournament where they lost in the first round to UCLA.

Roster

Schedule

|-
!colspan=9 style=""| Exhibition

|-
!colspan=9 style=""| Non-conference regular season

|-
!colspan=9 style=""| Mountain West regular season

|-
!colspan=9 style=""| Mountain West Women's Tournament

|-
!colspan=9 style=""| NCAA Women's Tournament

Rankings
2016–17 NCAA Division I women's basketball rankings

See also
2016–17 Boise State Broncos men's basketball team

References

Boise State Broncos women's basketball seasons
Boise State
Boise State
Boise
Boise